Sudan is divided into 18 states, or wilyat. The state with the largest population is Khartoum with  7,993,851 and the state with the smallest population is the Northern state with approximately 936,235 as of 2018. As of 2015, the Northern state is the only state in Sudan not to have surpassed 1 million in total population.

Total

Density

See also
 States of Sudan
 List of Sudanese states by Human Development Index
 List of current state governors in Sudan

References

States of Sudan